Houston is the planned southern terminus of the Texas Central Railway high-speed line. The station is located in the Lazybrook/Timbergrove neighborhood of Houston, Texas, northeast of the Interstate 610 and U.S. Route 290 interchange at the site of the former Northwest Mall.

Planning
Three alternatives were considered for the Houston passenger terminal: the former Northwest Mall, the industrial site directly southwest of the mall, and the nearby METRO Northwest Transit Center. The mall was chosen as the station site in 2018.

References

Railway stations in Houston
Economy of Houston
Railway stations scheduled to open in 2026
Texas Central Railway
Proposed railway stations in the United States